Frederick Fish may refer to:

Frederick Samuel Fish (1852–1936), American lawyer, politician and automotive executive at Studebaker
Frederick Perry Fish (1855–1930), American lawyer and executive, president of American Telephone & Telegraph Corporation
Fred Fish (1952–2007), American computer programmer known for GNU Debugger and free Fish disks for Amiga
Freddi Fish, a series of computer games by Humongous Entertainment